Environmental Microbiology is a monthly peer-reviewed scientific journal focused on microbial interactions and microbial processes in the environment. It is published by Wiley-Blackwell on behalf of the Society for Applied Microbiology. According to the Journal Citation Reports, the journal has a 2021 impact factor of 5.476.

References

External links

Wiley-Blackwell academic journals
Monthly journals
English-language journals
Microbiology journals